Crematogaster elegans is a species of ant in the genus Crematogaster.

References

External links

Insects described in 1859
elegans